Fauzia Ilyas (born 1989) is a Dutch Pakistani speaker, political activist, and the president and co-founder of Atheist & Agnostic Alliance Pakistan. Ilyas, an open atheist and apostate of Islam, fled from Pakistan after receiving threats to her life and faced potential legal charges for blasphemy in Pakistan. Ilyas received asylum in the Netherlands, where she is now a critic of Islam and campaigner for feminism, secularism, and atheist rights in Pakistan.

Biography

Youth and arranged marriage 
Ilyas was born in 1989 and grew up in a religious Sunni Muslim family in Pakistan. At the age of 16, her father announced her arranged marriage with a businessman whom she had never met, and her new husband forced her to wear a veil and sexually abused her. Ilyas sought help from her parents, but they refused, giving Islamic excuses for her husband's behaviour. After daily unanswered prayers, Ilyas increasingly questioned the existence of Allah and professed her doubts to her husband, who reacted by forcing her out of their home and preventing her from seeing their daughter.

Apostasy and escape 

Later, Ilyas met a fellow atheist in Lahore named Sayed Gillani. They married and together founded Atheist & Agnostic Alliance Pakistan in 2012. After failing to keep their identities secret, Ilyas and Gillani faced death threats and charges of blasphemy, which is legally punishable by death in Pakistan. In 2015, they fled via Dubai to the Netherlands. First, Ilyas arrived in an asylum centre in Den Helder on 30 August, and was joined by Gillani in December after friends helped him fund his escape from Pakistan.

Activism 
As of December 2015, the Atheist & Agnostic Alliance of Pakistan had about 3,000 members.

Ilyas featured both in Deeyah Khan's British documentary Islam's Non-Believers (October 2016) and in Dorothée Forma's Dutch documentary Non-believers: Freethinkers on the Run (December 2016).

In January 2017, Ilyas presented her story to the European Parliament with the International Humanist and Ethical Union. In April, she also received the International Atheist of the Year award. Ilyas criticised Facebook for taking down almost all Pakistan-based secular and Islam-critical pages in response to mass flagging campaigns by Islamists. She argued that Facebook should be a platform for freedom of expression, and stop facilitating the Islamist crackdown against so-called "blasphemers".

See also 
 Ali A. Rizvi, Pakistani-born Canadian ex-Muslim activist and writer
 Aliyah Saleem, Pakistani-born ex-Muslim activist from Faith to Faithless
 Ex-Muslims of North America, co-founded by Pakistani-American ex-Muslim activists Muhammad Syed and Sarah Haider
 Maajid Nawaz, Pakistani-British liberal Muslim activist

References

1989 births
21st-century atheists
Dutch atheism activists
Former Muslim critics of Islam
Critics of Sunni Islam
Living people
Pakistani atheists
Pakistani emigrants to the Netherlands
Pakistani former Muslims
Dutch former Muslims
Pakistani human rights activists
Dutch human rights activists
Women human rights activists
Pakistani secularists
Dutch secularists
People from Lahore
People from Den Helder
University of the Punjab alumni
Naturalised citizens of the Netherlands
Former Muslims turned agnostics or atheists
Dutch critics of Islam
Articles containing video clips